Abdol Hoseyni (also Romanized as ʿAbdol Hoseynī; also known as Nūshād Golābān-e Do) is a village in Veysian Rural District, Veysian District, Dowreh County, Lorestan Province, Iran. At the 2006 census, its population was 25, in 6 families.

References 

Towns and villages in Dowreh County